The John W. Shaver House is a historic house at the northwest corner of Main and Cammack Streets in Evening Shade, Arkansas.  Built in 1854, it is the oldest house in Evening Shade, and it was built by its first permanent settler and businessman, John W. Shaver.  It is a -story brick structure, with a side gable roof that has a series of tall cross-gable dormers (a late 19th-century addition) on the front facade.  Shaver arrived in the area in 1844 as a fur trader.

The house was listed on the National Register of Historic Places in 1982.

See also
Charles W. Shaver House, home of John W. Shaver's son
National Register of Historic Places listings in Sharp County, Arkansas

References

Houses on the National Register of Historic Places in Arkansas
Houses completed in 1854
Houses in Sharp County, Arkansas
National Register of Historic Places in Sharp County, Arkansas